The Ferrari 312 P was a Group 6 Prototype-Sports Car used for racing in 1969 and 1970. The new 1971 version of the sports prototype came with a flat-12 engine, often referred to as a boxer engine. Many publications added the letter B after the P of its name to indicate its engine type, but this variation was never officially sanctioned by Ferrari which simply called it the 1971 312P.

History 
After boycotting sports car racing in 1968 to protest a rule change that also banned their 4-litre 330 P4, Ferrari built a 3000cc prototype in 1969, the 312 P. It was hardly more than a 3-litre F1 Ferrari 312 with open Barchetta, and later the closed top Berlinetta.

Car in Racing
The first registered race was at the 12 Hours of Sebring in 1969. Ferrari (short on money) started only one 312 P (chassis no. 0868). Mario Andretti got pole position, and with Chris Amon, he managed to finish second. This raised  hopes for a prospective Ferrari victory. At the ensuing test weekend at Le Mans, a different car, chassis no. 0870, disappointed, and it was clear that better aerodynamics (with a closed coupe) were necessary. The 0870 also raced at the BOAC 500 in Brands Hatch, where Amon and Pedro Rodríguez finished fourth (behind three Porsche 908-01). At 1000km Monza, Chris Amon took the pole with the 312 P spider, ahead of Jo Siffert's 908-01, but had to retire. The 312 P was not entered in the second Italian race, the Targa Florio, and had to retire in the German 1000 km Nürburgring. At the 1000 km Spa race, the 312 P of Rodriguez and David Piper was second behind the Siffert/Redman 908-01LH. Two 312 Ps were entered in the 1969 24 Hours of Le Mans, now as low-drag Berlinettas. They were fifth and sixth on the grid, but didn't finish.

During the 1969 season, the appearance of the Porsche 917 had made clear that only a similar new 5-litre car would be able to challenge it. Since mid-1969, Ferrari spent some of the millions earned in the Fiat deal for the construction of the required series of 25 new 5-litre V12 Group 5 sports cars. At the end of the season the two remaining 312 Ps were sold to Luigi Chinetti's North American Racing Team, since the European branch of Ferrari racing would rely on the Ferrari 512 in 1970. The 312 Ps returned to Europe for the 1970 24 Hours of Le Mans, where one of them was raced (as opposed to eleven 512s). The car was among the 16 cars still running at the end.

Specifications
Top speed = 320 km/h(198.8mph)

Engine

Type: rear, longitudinal V12 60°

Bore/stroke: 78.5 x 51.5 mm

Unitary displacement: 249.25 cc

Total displacement: 2991.01 cc

Compression ratio: 11,5:1

Maximum power: 331 kW (450 hp) at 10.800 RPM

Power per litre: 150 hp/l

Valve actuation: Twin overhead camshaft per bank, four valves per cylinder

Fuel feed: Lucas indirect injection  //  Ignition = Single spark plug per cylinder, electronic

Lubrication: Dry sump

Clutch: Multi-plate

Chassis

Frame: tubular steel

Front and rear suspension: Independent, unequal-length wishbones, coil springs, telescopic shock absorbers, anti-roll bar

Brakes: Discs

Transmission: 5-speed + reverse

Steering: Rack-and-pinion

Fuel tank: Capacity 117 litres

Front tyres: 9-22-13

Rear tyres: 13-26-15

Bodywork

Type: Two-seater spider

Length: 3500 mm

Width: 1880 mm

Height: 956 mm

Wheelbase: 2220 mm

Front track: 1425 mm

Rear track: 1400 mm

Weight: 585 kg (with liquids)

References
Notes

Bibliography

External links
312 P (1969) on Ferrari's website

312P
Sports prototypes